Die Ludolfs – 4 Brüder auf’m Schrottplatz is a documentary-styled reality TV series produced by Preview Production GBR and shown on DMAX in Germany. The show is about the four brothers, Uwe (born 27 September 1951), Horst-Günter (born 22 February 1954), Peter (born 5 August 1955) and Manfred "Manni" (born 29 July 1962) Ludolf.

Günter Ludolf died on January 31, 2011.

History 
In 2002, the German public TV station SWR Fernsehen intended to make a documentary on Dernbach (Landkreis Neuwied in the Westerwald). During filming, the mayor sent the journalists to the Ludolfs and a short portrait of the family (including the mother, who was still alive) was produced. After that, the SWR decided to produce a two-part-documentary (30 minutes each) under the title Schrott-Brüder – Die Autoverwerter aus dem Westerwald (Junk Brothers - The car recyclers from the Westerwald).
	
Several private TV stations (such as Kabel 1 and RTL 2) broadcast reports about the unusual family. DMAX later decided to produce an entire TV series about them. The show was so successful that, on New Year's Day 2008, a 24-hour Ludolfs marathon was shown on DMAX. This marathon was repeated on New Year's Day 2009.

On 12 March 2008, a fourth season was launched. The series has also been shown on Dutch television (with subtitles) and, since early 2008, on Discovery Russia  in Russian synchronization.

After Horst-Günter Ludolf's death 
Following Horst-Günter Ludolf's death in January 2011, 12 episodes starring the three brothers were shown online on .de.

In 2012, Sport1 renewed and renamed the series SEK Ludolf - Das Schrott Einsatz Kommando which included 12 episodes and one "best-of".

In January 2016, the series was shown as Die Ludolfs - Das Schrottimperium ist zurück after four years of absence on kabel eins in which only Uwe, his son Tommy and Manfred Ludolf establish a new scrapyard. Peter Ludolf manages the old scrapyard and does not appear in the series.

The documentary 
The DMAX television series displays the life and work of the Ludolf brothers, who own a car recycling yard. With their unusual business and lifestyle, the Ludolfs had a certain cult status in their home town long before the series was filmed. They have a reputation for having any used car part that one might need. They organised an open door day in April 2007, an estimated 15,000 to 20,000 people went to view the garage and junk yard resulting in traffic congestion on the nearby A3 motorway.
 	
The stars of the series are Peter, Manfred, Uwe and (Horst-)Günter Ludolf. For over 30 years the brothers, including their father and the company founder, Horst, have collected between two and five million car parts. The parts, stored in a warehouse, are sorted by a homegrown "cluster principle" with only Peter Ludolf knowing which part is in which pile. Each of the four brothers has a specific task. It is up to Peter to locate the desired part whether the customer is at the door or on the phone. Günter answers the telephone and passes on the questions to Peter. Uwe and Manni, "Power and Hand" - a nickname they gave themselves due to the division of labour while disassembling junk cars. They are also responsible for fetching the cars.

The series' charm comes from the different personalities of the brothers and their often comical devotion to their work at the scrap yard. Peter Ludolf lives with his playful and childlike brother, Manni, in the former parental home located on the premises. Günter also lives with Peter and Manni since going through an existential crisis after his wife cheated on him. Günter rarely speaks or leaves the compound, but he smokes heavily and survives on coffee and vitamin tablets. Only lothario Uwe Ludolf leads a bourgeois life with his wife Karin and three adult children, who might possibly take over the company once the brothers retire.

Cameo appearances 
In the Daddy Cool issue, the rappers Bushido and Kay One are seen asking for a spare part for a Ford Fiesta.

Episodes 
Season 1:
 Der Scheunenfund
 Ein Mustang für die Ladies
 Voll der Manta
 Uwe will's nochmal wissen
 Manni weiß was Autos brauchen
 Ein Herz für Günter
 Die letzte Fahrt
 Creme 21
 Oh, du schöner Westerwald
 Ententanz mit 2CV
 Heimweh
 Ludolf Jr.
 Ordnung muss sein
Specials:
 SWR-Reportage: Die Schrott-Brüder 1/2
 SWR-Reportage: Die Schrott-Brüder 2/2
 Die Ludolfs feiern Weihnachten

Season  2:
 Vollgas unter roter Sonne
 Gentlemen, starten Sie die Motoren!
 Mercedes flambé
 Rückwärts schneller als vorwärts
 Herbie vs. Ralleyei
 Der Caravan zieht weiter
 Die Zitrone auf drei Rädern
 Elchtest à la Ludolfs

Season  3:
 Mannis Gedanken zum Klimawechsel
 Peter macht blau
 Das wankelmütige Wunderwerk
 Flower Power in Dernbach
 Der Zwergenaufstand
 In meinem Opel bin ich Kapitän
 BUMMS!
 Una festa nella Spider
 Oben ohne
 Hilfe, die Chinesen kommen
 Der italienische Stier
 Die Ludolfs gehen campen
 Design oder nicht sein
 Landlord vs. Cowboy
 Schneewittchen und die 4 Zwerge
 Der Packesel
 Go East
 Die Nippon-Connection
 Jetzt wird wieder in die Hände gespuckt
 Die Göttin aus Frankreich
 Das Auto des Bösen
 Peter hat Geburtstag
 Balance of Power
 Der Bayerische Herausforderer
 Spezial
Special:
 Die Höhepunkte

Season  4:
 Lang soll er Leben
 Von vorne oder von hinten?
 Es lebe das Haufenprinzip
 Der Römertopf
 Eine Hamburger Herzensangelegenheit
 Das Herz eines Boxers
 Ab in den Süden
 Die neue Bescheidenheit
 Kikeriki – Die Ludolfs auf dem Bauernhof
 Schluss mit lustig
 Franzosensafari
 Deichabenteuer
 Die spinnen, die Engländer
 Heavy Rider
 Crocodile Manni
 Es lebe Europa!
Specials:
 Formel Exclusiv mit den Ludolfs
 Die Ludolfs – Höhepunkte
 Die Ludolfs bei TV-Total
 Die Ludolfs – Schlaflos in Dernbach
 Die 10 beliebtesten Doku-Soaps – Die Ludolfs
 Günter allein zu Haus

Season  5:
 Der runde Baron von Dernbach
 Ich schalte, also bin ich
 Amerika ist überall
 Die silberne Zitrone
 Relax Revolution
 Der Alleskönner
 Das Duell
 Olympische Spiele
 Alles bleibt anders

Season  6:
 Daddy Cool
 Rocket Manni
 Ei, Ei, Ei – Die Ludolfs
 Schatzsuche im Westerwald
 Das Seifenkistenrennen
 Die Ehre der Ludolfs
 Super Cooper
 Die Führerscheinprüfung
 Die 13 schönsten Momente (Best-Of)

Season  7:
 Ein Auto sticht in See
 Der Monstertruck
 Unter den Wolken
 Die Renovierung
 Die Tapeten-Revolution
 Taxi, Taxi
 Im Land der Pommes Frites
 Fünf-Uhr-Tee mit der Queen
 Westerwälder Auto-Träume
Special:
 Die 13 schönsten Momente

Season  8:
 Spiele ohne Grenzen
 Eine Luxussänfte für Manni
 Der mit dem Auto tanzt
 Der heilige Sonntag
 Liebe geht durch den Magen

DVD box 
A DVD box of the series called Die Ludolfs was released in April 2007 and contains 12 episodes - three DVDs with four episodes each - the first season without further bonus material. Of the first 13 episodes of the series, the first five ( "Manni knows what cars need") have been released. The episodes do not contain commercials, but the lead ups to the commercials can still be seen.

In October 2007, the second season with eight episodes was released on two DVDs. Another box with 12 episodes of the third season (3.1) was released in March 2008.

In June 2008, the second part of the third season was published (3.2) with 11 episodes on three DVDs.

At the same time, various bonus episodes from the second season such as "Day of open door" and "Christmas with the Ludolfs" were published.

Movie 
A Munich-based production company, preview Production, which also produces documentaries on DMAX, planned a feature film called Die Ludolfs - Dankeschön für Italien (The Ludolfs - thank you for Italy) to release in early 2009 which finally came out in April. Filming was done in their native Dernbach and the places they go in Italy.

Books 
Two books, Die Ludolfs - Das Buch about the background of the series and Peter's Kochbuch with 40 cooking recipes, have been published. There is also a comic book with the title Die Ludolfs – Der Fluch des Tut Nich Imun.

Merchandise 
Articles such as puzzles, coffee mugs, kitchen aprons, baseball caps, sweat shirts and T-shirts are available. For the movie start in the theatres, the toy producer Dickie Toys presented a line of toys displaying a miniature edition of the Ludolfs and some of their cars.

References

External links 
 Internetseite zum neuen Kinofilm der Ludolfs
 Der Tagesspiegel über die Ludolfs: „Gebrüder Schrott“
 Bericht über den Tag der Offenen Tür bei den Ludolfs

German documentary television series
2006 German television series debuts
2011 German television series endings
2000s German television series
2010s German television series
German-language television shows